Guillermina Grant (born 22 June 2002) is a Uruguayan tennis player, who played at the Uruguay on the Fed Cup since 2017.

Grant has a career-high ITF juniors ranking of 31, achieved on 2 March 2020.

In December 2020, Grant signed with the Georgia Bulldogs college team for the 2021-22 season.

ITF junior finals

Singles (5–2)

Doubles (7–5)

National representation

Fed Cup
Grant made her Fed Cup debut for Uruguay in 2017, while the team was competing in the Americas Zone Group II, when she was 15 years and 27 days old.

Fed Cup (16–9)

Singles (9–5)

Doubles (2–3)

References

External links
 
 

2002 births
Living people
Uruguayan female tennis players
Sportspeople from Montevideo
Georgia Lady Bulldogs tennis players
21st-century Uruguayan women